Sergio Maselli (born 6 April 2001) is an Italian footballer who plays as a midfielder for  club Juve Stabia.

Career
He joined the youth teams of Lecce in the summer of 2018. He made his debut for the senior squad of Lecce on 4 December 2019 in a Coppa Italia game against SPAL. He substituted Simone Lo Faso in the 75th minute of a 1–5 away loss. For the remainder of the 2019–20 season, he was a member of the senior squad, but remained on the bench in all games and did not make his Serie A debut as Lecce was relegated to Serie B.

He made his Serie B debut for Lecce on 3 October 2020 in a game against Ascoli. He substituted Žan Majer in the 70th minute.

On 9 August 2021, he joined Serie C club Foggia on a season-long loan.

On 6 July 2022, Maselli signed with Juve Stabia.

References

External links
 

2001 births
Living people
Sportspeople from the Metropolitan City of Bari
Footballers from Apulia
Italian footballers
Association football midfielders
Serie B players
Serie C players
U.S. Lecce players
Calcio Foggia 1920 players
S.S. Juve Stabia players